Anthony Arie Hyman (born 27 May 1962) FRS is a British scientist and director at the Max Planck Institute of Molecular Cell Biology and Genetics.

Personal life and education
Hyman was educated at University College London and King's College, Cambridge, where he was awarded a PhD in 1987.

Hyman was married to American scientist Suzanne Eaton (1959–2019); the couple had two children.

Research
Hyman has focused his career on examining microtubules and how these structures of the cytoskeleton control: cell division, mitotic spindle position, and cell polarity. Hyman's research has identified how microtubules are made into cellular structures and how they are broken down.

While at King's College, Cambridge, Hyman worked under the supervision of John White and was a key researcher in Sydney Brenner's C. elegans group.  Using microscopy and microsurgery, he examined the placement of cell axes during early cell division of C.elegans embryos.  Hyman presented new findings about mechanisms of rotation by cutting microtubules with a laser beam.  Hyman demonstrated that pulling forces acting from the posterior cortex on microtubules drives spindle rotation.

At the University of California, San Francisco, Hyman investigated the interaction between chromosomes and microtubules that create the mitotic forces that separate chromosomes in the lab of Tim Mitchison.  He also created a number of tools that are used today:
 atypical hydrolysable GTP analog GMPCPP
 various fluorescent tubulin derivatives
 assays for motors and microtubule polarity

While at the European Molecular Biology Laboratory (EMBL) Hyman along with Rebecca Heald and Eric Karsenti combined their work to create an impact on the current understanding of how the meiotic spindle self assembles. Hyman created his first independent group at EMBL that discovered that the important factors in Xenopus egg extracts were the stabilizing protein, XMAP215 and the destabilizing protein, XKCM1.

In 1999, Hyman became one of the four founding directors of Max Planck Institute of Molecular Cell Biology and Genetics and was the Managing Director for the institute from 2010–2013.  During his tenure at the MPI-CBG, Hyman and his lab members have focused on:
 Cytoplasmic organization and how cells form non-membrane bound compartments
 Size and scaling of the spindle, centrosomes, and other organelles 
 Spatial control of the microtubule cytoskeleton
 Positioning of the spindle

Hyman has worked on creating parts lists for cell division among human cells as part of the EU funded projects Mitocheck and MitoSys.

Hyman is currently studying the mechanisms by which cells compartmentalize their biochemistry. Of his many contributions to the field of molecular biology, he is best known for two discoveries in particular: In 2000, his team pioneered the use of RNA interference to define the "parts lists" for different cytoplasmic processes. And in 2009, while teaching a physiology course in Woods Hole, he, together with Cliff Brangwynne and Frank Julicher, made a fundamental breakthrough by being the first to observe that compartments in cells can form by phase separation. Aberrant phase transitions within liquid-like compartments may underlie amyotrophic lateral sclerosis (ALS) and other neurodegenerative and age-related diseases. Hyman's current work focuses on the physical-chemical basis by which intrinsically disordered proteins phase separate. Using this knowledge, he is studying the roles of phase separation in physiology and disease.

Other activities
 Wellcome Trust, Member of the Strategic Advisory Board on Science

Awards and honours
Anthony Hyman is honorary professor at the Faculty of Biology at TU Dresden. In 2011, Hyman was awarded the Gottfried Wilhelm Leibniz Prize, Germany's most prestigious research award, for his work on microtubules and cell division. Hyman was elected a Member of the European Molecular Biology Organization (EMBO) in 2000 and was awarded its Gold Medal in 2003. He was elected a Fellow of the Royal Society (FRS) in 2007. The Academia Europaea elected Hyman as a member in 2014  and in 2017, he received the Schleiden Medal from the German National Academy of Sciences Leopoldina. In 2020, he was given the NOMIS Distinguished Scientist Award by the NOMIS Foundation. Hyman was elected Member of the National Academy of Sciences in April 2020. In February 2021, Hyman was awarded the 2021 Wiley Prize in Biomedical Sciences for his work on biomolecular condensates. He received the 2021 HFSP Nakasone Award together with Clifford Brangwynne and he was elected a member of the German National Academy of Sciences Leopoldina in 2021. In 2022, Hyman received the Körber European Science Prize 2022. For 2023 he was awarded the Breakthrough Prize in Life Sciences for discovering a fundamental mechanism of cellular organization mediated by phase separation of proteins and RNA into membraneless liquid droplets.

References

External links

Anthony Hyman's seminars: "Organization of Cytoplasm"
Anthony Hyman's Brief Overview: "Visualizing Plus-end Growth"

Video 
 Video on Anthony A. Hyman's research (Latest Thinking)

Gottfried Wilhelm Leibniz Prize winners
1962 births
Living people
People educated at William Ellis School
Fellows of the Royal Society
20th-century British biologists
21st-century British biologists
Alumni of University College London
Alumni of King's College, Cambridge
People from Haifa
Schleiden Medal recipients
Max Planck Institute directors